The HM-3 is a submachine gun of Mexican origin chambered in the 9mm calibre and, since 2011, in .380 ACP caliber for private security forces, from a magazine fed from the grip, much like the Uzi.

This sub-machine gun is manufactured by  Productos Mendoza, S.A. in Mexico. It is a lightweight weapon of reduced overall length achieved by largely extending the wrap around bolt forward around the barrel. A grip safety is provided to prevent accidental discharge. The stock is designed in a manner that makes folding and unfolding easy and provides a foregrip when the stock is folded. The selector lever is on the right-hand side of the weapon so that it can be operated by the right hand without releasing the weapon with either hand. The stock can be folded or unfolded while gripping the weapon with both hands unlike the previous models of the same gun. It is much like the UZI in the way that the magazine is located on the grip.

Variants

9mm caliber models

There are currently three variations on the HM-3 using a 9mm caliber round. The HM-3-S LONG is a 15.74 in (23.85 in with extended stock) long model, used primarily for the Mexican Police and other State and Municipal security forces. The HM-3-S SHORT is almost identical, with the exception that the barrel is shortened and therefore measures only 12.99 in (21.06 in with extended stock). The HM-3-S BULLDOG (also called HM-3-S Mini) is a miniature version of the weapon, especially designed to be carried by motorcycle police and bodyguards, and measures only 10.8 in (19.3 in with extended stock) in length and weighs 2,827 g (6.2 lbs) with a full 32-round magazine. All versions may use 20 or 32-round magazines.

.380 caliber models
Since 2011, Productos Mendoza has manufactured a variation of the HM-3-S that shoots a .380 ACP caliber round. This is the largest caliber available to use by private security companies and individuals in Mexico, and the most popular caliber for personal defence in Latin America. The HM-3-S LONG model is called "COBRA .380" and the HM-3-S BULLDOG is called "BULLDOG .380". These names were created to facilitate the models' introduction to the consumer market. All specs are the same (excluding caliber) than the HM-3-S 9mm models, with the exception that .380 models can carry a 35-round magazine.

Specs

See also
Mondragón rifle
Mendoza RM2
Zaragoza Corla

References

External links
 Official Website
 https://web.archive.org/web/20060828062417/http://www.probertencyclopaedia.com/cgi-bin/res.pl?keyword=HM-3&offset=0
 http://www.gunsworld.com/gun_smg/Mendoza_HM3.htm
 http://www.securityarms.com/20010315/galleryfiles/3000/3027.htm

.380 ACP submachine guns 
9mm Parabellum submachine guns
Submachine guns of Mexico